Ludwig Haas (16 April 1933 – 4 September 2021) was a German television actor. He is best known for portraying Dr. Ludwig Dressler in the WDR German television series Lindenstraße, since the very first episode in 1985.

Personal life
Haas was born in Eutin, Schleswig-Holstein, Germany. He was married to Marianne Simon-Haas. They had one daughter together, Franca Simon, and lived in Einfeld in Schleswig-Holstein and Mallorca.

Partial filmography

1975-1992: Tatort - Prof. Wimmer / Leiter der BKA-Außenstelle Bonn / Richter
1979: Der Willi-Busch-Report
1981–1987: Ein Fall für zwei (TV Series) - Wunderlich / Herr Schlagheck
1984: Echt tu matsch
1985: Big Mäc - Rektor
1985: Die Einsteiger - Manager
1985: Georgenberg
1985: Die Küken kommen
1985–2020: Lindenstraße (TV Series) - Dr. Ludwig Dressler (final appearance)
1986: The Assault - General von Braunstein
1986–1988: Der Fahnder (TV Series) - Dr. Braun / Möllner
1987:  - Hotel manager
1987: Das Mädchen mit den Feuerzeugen - Hotelmanager
1987–1991: The Old Fox (TV Series) - Dr. Ballhorn
1988: Tagebuch für einen Mörder (TV Movie) - Dave Hamley
1988: The Great Escape II: The Untold Story (TV Movie) - Adolf Hitler
1989: Forsthaus Falkenau (TV Series) - Herr Malzach
1989–1992: Derrick (TV Series) - Kramer / Notarzt
1990: Voll daneben – Gags with Diether Krebs
1992: Shining Through - Adolf Hitler
1992:  - Fuchsmühl
1993: Unser Lehrer Doktor Specht (TV Series) - Stadtrat Paulick
1993: Pétain - Hitler
1993: Texas – Doc Snyder hält die Welt in Atem - von Zitzewitz
1995: Entführung aus der Lindenstraße (TV Movie) - Walther Planck
1997: Stubbe – Von Fall zu Fall (TV Series) - Wirt
1997–1998: Die Wache (TV Series) - Nikolaus Baron von Laubenthal
1998: Wolffs Revier (TV Series) - Kaminski
1999: SK Kölsch (TV Series) - Hans Dorfmeister
2001: Drehkreuz Airport (TV Series)

References

External links
 

Bio at Lindenstraße website 

1933 births
2021 deaths
German male television actors
German male film actors
People from Eutin
People from the Province of Schleswig-Holstein